The Blue Ridge Conservancy is a non-profit land conservation organization based in Boone, North Carolina that works to preserve working farmland and natural areas in western North Carolina.  The organization's focus is on land in Alleghany, Ashe, Avery, Mitchell, Wautauga, Wilkes and Yancey counties.

The Blue Ridge Conservancy was formed in 2010 from the merger of two organizations: the Blue Ridge Land Trust and the High Country Conservancy. Since its founding from the original two organizations, the Blue Ridge Conservancy has protected over  through donations, purchases and conservation easements, including lands that have been transferred to the Blue Ridge Parkway and Elk Knob State Park.

The organization is accredited by the Land Trust Accreditation Commission, an independent program of the Land Trust Alliance.

References

External links
 Blue Ridge Conservancy - official site

Land trusts in North Carolina
2010 establishments in North Carolina
Organizations established in 2010